The Murovdağ or Mrav (anglicized as Murovdagh,) is the highest mountain range in the Lesser Caucasus. It is made up mainly of Jurassic, Cretaceous and Paleogene rocks.

The Murovdağ ridge or Mrav range extends north from Hinaldag Peak through Gamish (or Gomshasar) Mountain. The northeastern slope features a group of scenic lakes, including Göygöl near the northern slope. The Karabakh/Syunik Plateau extends from the south of Murovdağ/Mrav. Fir and spruce forests are spread as far southeast as the Murovdağ. The summer mountain pastures of Murovdağ/Mrav were traditionally used by Azerbaijani and Armenian shepherds.

History
Following the First Nagorno-Karabakh War, the mountain ridge formed the northern part of the line of contact separating the self-proclaimed Republic of Artsakh from Azerbaijan. Its southern slopes ran through the Martakert region of Nagorno-Karabakh. In late 1993–early 1994, the ridge was the scene of the bloodiest battle of the First Nagorno-Karabakh War that ended in an Armenian victory.

During the 2020 Nagorno-Karabakh war, the peak of Murovdag came under Azerbaijani control.

Gallery

References

External links 
 

Mountain ranges of the Caucasus
Mountain ranges of Azerbaijan
Kalbajar District